"Set the World Afire" is a song by the American thrash metal band Megadeth. It is the second track from their third studio album, So Far, So Good... So What!, which was released in 1988 by Capitol Records.

Development 
"Set the World Afire" was the first song frontman Dave Mustaine wrote after being kicked out of Metallica. On the topic, Dave Mustaine said "The first song that I wrote on my way back from New York was written on the back of a cupcake wrapper, if you can believe that."

The song was originally titled "Megadeth", inspired by a political pamphlet Mustaine had read on the bus ride after being kicked out. After the band decided to use the song title for the name of the band, they retitled the song to "Set the World Afire".

Music and lyrics 
The lyrics of the song are about nuclear holocaust.
The beginning of the song features a quiet sample of "I Don't Want to Set the World on Fire", a 1941 song by The Ink Spots.

Live 
"Set the World Afire" was played at the first ever Megadeth concert, with Kerry King on guitar. After the band changed their name, the song was known as "Burnt Offerings", and possibly "No Time". A bootleg CD-R of their first show was also named Burnt Offerings, after the early title. A live performance on September 7, 2005 in Buenos Aires, Argentina, was included as track 3 on That One Night: Live in Buenos Aires. When played, some fans yell about it being "the cupcake song!".

Personnel

Production 
 Produced by Paul Lani and Dave Mustaine
 Engineered by Paul Lani with Matt Freeman
 Mixed by Michael Wagener
 Executive produced by Tim Carr
 Mastered by Stephen Marcussen

References

1988 songs
Megadeth songs
Songs written by Dave Mustaine
Songs about nuclear war and weapons